Magdalene Mary Therese Szubanski  (born 12 April 1961) is an Australian comedy actress, author, singer and LGBT rights advocate. She performed in Fast Forward, Kath & Kim as Sharon Strzelecki and in the films Babe (1995) and Babe: Pig in the City (1998), Happy Feet (2006) and Happy Feet Two (2011). In 2003 and 2004 surveys, she polled as the most recognised and well-liked Australian television personality.

Szubanski has spoken openly about her struggles with intergenerational trauma, anxiety and suicidal ideation in her teens. She became an activist for LGBT rights and, in 2017, promoted same-sex marriage in Australia. In 2015, Szubanski released her memoir, Reckoning.

Early life and education 
Szubanski was born on 12 April 1961, in Liverpool, England. Her mother Margaret (née McCarthy) is Scottish-Irish and came from a poor family. Her father, Zbigniew Szubanski, came from a well-off Polish family and was an assassin in a counter-intelligence branch of the Polish resistance movement in World War II. She is a cousin of Polish actress Magdalena Zawadzka.

She attended Siena College, Melbourne.  In 1976, as a Year 10 student, she captained a team on the television quiz show It's Academic. Szubanski studied fine arts and philosophy at the University of Melbourne and, decades later, in 2016, attained a Bachelor of Arts and Bachelor of Arts (degree with honours).

Career

Television

Szubanski was a writer and performer of sketch comedy. In 1985, while performing in a University of Melbourne revue of Too Cool for Sandals, Szubanski, Michael Veitch, Tom Gleisner and others were talent-spotted by Australian Broadcasting Corporation (ABC) producers, which led to The D-Generation television sketch comedy show.

Szubanski was one of the creators and performers of the Fast Forward television sketch comedy for the Seven Network, in which she played various characters, including Pixie-Anne Wheatley, Chenille from the Institute de Beauté, Wee Mary MacGregor, Joan Kirner, Michelle Grogan. The character of Lynne Postlethwaite was first performed on the ABC's The D-Generation. It was originally written by John Allsop and Andrew Knight, but from Fast Forward on Szubanski co-wrote the sketches, and created and co-wrote her characters.

In 1995, she and friends Gina Riley and Jane Turner wrote, performed and produced the first all-female Australian sketch comedy television program; Big Girl's Blouse. When Riley and Turner developed sketch-characters they had created into the sitcom Kath & Kim, Szubanski joined them to play Sharon Strzelecki, a character she had previously created. That same year, Szubanski hosted the 37th Australian Film Institute Awards.

In 1999, Szubanski created, wrote, co-produced and played Margaret O'Halloran in the Dogwoman series of TV films, a detective style show based on the idea an expert "dog-whisperer" who, by treating problem dogs, inadvertently stumbles upon and solves human crimes.

In 2009, she appeared on Who Do You Think You Are? where she explored her father's Polish Resistance activities as well as the story of her shell-shocked Irish grandfather and her sculptor ancestor Luigi Isepponi who assisted in making the Death mask for William Burke, half of the duo Burke and Hare, notorious grave robbers and serial killers.

From 3 September 2018, Szubanski recurred as Jemima Davies-Smythe on Neighbours. Her character officiated the first same-sex wedding on Australian television.

On 8 April 2019, she appeared as "Guest Announcer" on Chris & Julia's Sunday Night Takeaways season finale where she participated in a number of roles.

On 9 March 2021, Szubanski was announced as the host of the Nine Network's revival of The Weakest Link. Initially due to premiere on 4 May 2021, it instead premiered on 25 May following a tight production schedule.

Film
Szubanski performed in the 1995 film Babe as Esme Hoggett. She reprised her role in the 1998 sequel, Babe: Pig in the City. She then teamed up again with director/producer George Miller to voice the role of Miss Viola in the animated films Happy Feet and Happy Feet Two.

In 2007, she had a minor role as Mrs Lonsdale, the housemaid in The Golden Compass to Lyra Belacqua.

Musical theatre
In 2007, Szubanski ventured into musical comedy, taking on the role of William Barfee in the Melbourne Theatre Company production of the hit Broadway musical The 25th Annual Putnam County Spelling Bee. Variety described her performance as "sensationally good". Australian Stage said, "Magda Szubanski as the Eric Cartman-esque William Barfee steals the show."

In 2008, she again participated in some gender-blind casting, taking on the role of pint-sized gangster Big Jule in a major stage production of Guys and Dolls.

In 2010, she appeared in the first Indigenous musical film Bran Nue Dae as Roadhouse Betty alongside Geoffrey Rush, Ernie Dingo, Missy Higgins and Deborah Mailman. The film was directed by Rachel Perkins, daughter of the Aboriginal activist Charlie Perkins.

In 2012, she again teamed with Rush to appear in the Stephen Sondheim musical A Funny Thing Happened on the Way to the Forum.

 Art 
In 2020, Szubanski was the painted subject of Wendy Sharpe's Archibald Prize entry, a portrait painting competition held by the Art Gallery of New South Wales.  In Sharpe's painting, Comedy and Tragedy, Szubanski is depicted as Sharon Strzelecki, standing amongst flaming buildings during an air raid.  

The painting achieved finalist status in the competition; and in an interview with AGNSW, Sharpe commented:

‘After an intense conversation with Magda in my Sydney studio, I decided to change my original concept for the portrait and painted her as a despairing version of her comic character/alter ego Sharon. Magda is haunted by her father’s traumatic experiences in World War II in the Polish resistance, and by current world events.’ 

Other projects
In 2004, Szubanski advertised the airline Jetstar. Szubanski became a spokesperson for the dieting company Jenny Craig in November 2008. Szubanski joined Jenny Craig weighing 110 kg and had been diagnosed with sleep apnoea. By July 2009, she had lost 36 kg to weigh 85 kg. She later regained weight, then was dropped as a spokesperson for Jenny Craig. However, subsequent weight loss led to her being re-signed as their spokesperson. She was later again dropped from Jenny Craig. She was also featured in commercials for Telstra in 2014. In 2019, she appeared in an Uber Eats ad in her Sharon Strzelecki character with a "Kim", referencing fellow Kath & Kim character Kim Craig, but who turns out to be Kim Kardashian.

Memoir
In 2015, Szubanski released a memoir, Reckoning, in large part about her father, Zbigniew Szubanski who was a World War 2 Polish Resistance assassin, and dealing with themes of intergenerational trauma, possible genetic inheritance of traumatic memory and Szubanski's struggles with her own sexuality. The book won the TBA and $40,000 Douglas Stewart Prize for Nonfiction and "Book of the Year" and "Biography of the Year" at the Australian Book Industry Awards. Reviewer Peter Craven, in The Australian, said it would "dazzle every kind of reader" and described it as "a riveting, overwhelmingly poignant autobiography by a woman of genius. It is a book about how someone might live with the idea of killing the thing they love. It is a story of love and death and redemption and a daughter's love for her father. It is an extraordinary hymn to the tragic heroism at the heart of ordinary life and the soaring moral scrutiny of womankind. Every library should have it, every school should teach it." Richard Ferguson in The Sydney Morning Herald wrote, "This is documentary writing of the highest order and Szubanski has given life to an incredible war story…Reckoning, this tale of war and suburbia, sexuality and comedy" and referred to Szubanski as an A-grade non-fiction writer.

Actor and friend Geoffrey Rush launched her book and wrote in The Guardian: "I was absorbed in preparing for King Lear when I read the book. The classical stature of that particular father-daughter relationship didn't go unnoticed. Magda grew up in the shadow of a difficult reckoning — the summation, the questioning, the Elizabethan sense of settling the bill with one's parents. As she phrases it: her father needed to forget— she needed to remember. The only way forward was back. Her book riffs a major life in a reflective minor key. I've got lost in Joyce's Dublin, Woolf's Bloomsbury, the Bronte Sisters' Yorkshire moors. Now I'm enthralled with Magda Szubanski's Croydon, Australia's own collective sub-conscious suburb, the architecture of which she deftly anoints as Bauhaus's "bastard child"...Reckoning is really a non-fiction novel – and its invitation into Magda's story is infectious." The Premier's Award  judges  described Reckoning as 'warm, clear, wise, funny and deeply intelligent. The amplitude of Szubanski's writing is particularly impressive. Her voice has a light surety, while constantly giving narrative and moral weight to the larger themes of grief, family, migration and finding one's place in the world'."

 Recognition 
In 2019, Szubanski was appointed an officer in the general division of the Order of Australia (AO) "for distinguished service to the performing arts as an actor, comedian and writer, and as a campaigner for marriage equality."

LGBT rights activism
Szubanski has been a vocal campaigner for LGBT rights and for same-sex marriage since coming out publicly. She is patron of the LGBT group, Twenty/10.

During the same-sex Australian Marriage Law Postal Survey, Szubanski was interviewed on several TV shows advocating for a "Yes" result. The co-chair of Australian Marriage Equality  rated her crucial in the success of the "Yes" campaign. Some have credited her contribution to the same-sex marriage survey as having been "crucial" to the outcome. Her appearance on Q&A is considered by some to be pivotal in the debate. Her National Press Club address, entitled "What It Feels Like To Be An Unwilling Human Guinea Pig In A Political Experiment", spoke of the pain as well as the joy experienced by LGBT people throughout the duration of the survey.

Charity
In 2020, Szubanski and Will "Egg Boy" Connolly raised $190,000 for bushfire affected communities and together with trauma experts co-founded "Regeneration", a creative arts project to provide mental-health support.

In 2013, Szubanski became the Patron of "Twenty10".

Controversies
In 2019, Szubanski was involved in a campaign targeting Christian preacher and rugby league football player Israel Folau after he called on homosexuals to "repent of their sins and turn to God". Szubanski prominently launched an appeal to fund opposition to Folau. After Szubanski was criticized, Folau called for an end to on-line attacks on Szubanski.

In 2020, the Commissioner for eSafety, Julie Inman Grant, told senate estimates that Szubanski had been the target of "Volumetric...co-ordinated right-wing extremist attacks" after she appeared in a COVID safety ad.

In April 2021 Szubanski faced criticism and calls for her to hand back the award which had appointed her officer in the Order of Australia (AO) after she criticised the appearance of Jenny Morrison, wife of the Australian Prime Minister, Scott Morrison. Commenting on the Morrisons in a photograph of the Prime Minister signing a condolence book after the death of Prince Philip, Szubanski compared the Prime Minister's wife's appearance to a character in a fictional religious extremist society of sex slaves from the series The Handmaid's Tale.

Personal life

On 14 February 2012, Szubanski came out in a statement supporting same-sex marriage and stated that she "absolutely identifies as gay" in an interview on Australian TV current affairs program The Project. Szubanski has described herself as "culturally Catholic".

Filmography

Television

Film

Stage
 Too Cool for Sandals (1985) - various
 The Rise and Fall of Little Voice (1993) - Sadie
 Grease: The Arena Spectacular (National Australia Tour) (2005) - Miss Lynch
 The Madwoman of Chaillot – (2007) – Countess Aurelia
 Guys and Dolls (2008) – Big Jule
 A Funny Thing Happened on the Way to the Forum (2012) - Domina

 Awards Acting Won the 'Most Popular Comedy Personality' award at the 1991, 1992 and 1996 Logie awards
 Won the Australian Film Institute's award 'Best Actress in a Supporting or Guest Role in a Television Drama' award in 2002
 Nominated 'Best Family Actress' OFTA Film Awards 1999
 Nominated for the 'Most Popular Actress' award at the 2005 Logie Awards, for her role in Kath & Kim
 Nominated for 'Best Actress in a Supporting or Guest Role in a Television Drama or Comedy' award in 2003 at the AFI Awards
 Nominated for 'Best Actress in a Supporting or Guest Role in a Television Drama or Comedy' award in 2004 at the AFI Awards
 Nominated for 'Best Female actor in a Musical' at the 2006 Helpmann Awards for her role in The 25th Annual Putnam County Spelling Bee
 Nominated for 'Female Actor in a Featured Role' at the 2006 Green Room Awards for her role in The 25th Annual Putnam County Spelling Bee
 Nominated Silver Logie 'Most Popular Actress' in Kath & Kim 2008
 Nominated for 'Best Actress Supporting Role'  Film Critics Circle of Australia Awards 2014 for 'Goddess' Writing Winner –  Awgie Award for sketch comedy BIG GIRL'S BLOUSE
 Winner – Awgie Award FAST FORWARD Writing team best Comedy/Revue/Sketch, 1990, 1991
 Winner, Nielsen BookData Booksellers Choice Award, 2016 award
 Winner, Book of the Year, Australian Book Industry Awards, 2016 award
 Winner, Biography of the Year, Australian Book Industry Awards, 2016 award
 Winner, Douglas Stewart Prize for Non-Fiction, NSW Premier's Literary Awards, 2016 award
 Winner, Indie Award for Non-Fiction, 2016 award
 Winner, Victorian Community History Award Judges' Special Prize, 2016 award
 Shortlisted, Matt Richell Award for New Writer of the Year, Australian Book Industry Awards, 2016 award
 Shortlisted, Dobbie Literary Award, 2016 award
 Shortlisted, National Biography Award, 2016Other'''

 Winner, Liberty Voltaire Award for Free Speech, 2018
 Winner, Excellence in Women's Leadership Victoria, 2018
 Officer of the Order of Australia (AO), 2019
Nominated, Victorian Australian of the year, 2017
Australia Post, Australian Legends of Comedy stamp series, 2020

References

Further reading
Quinn, Karl: The Magda carta, The Age, 14 September 2003.
Quinn, Karl: Brand Magda Unlikely to Suffer for Coming Out, The Sydney Morning Herald,'' 16 February 2012
Cadzow, Jane: Good Weekend, 19 September 2015
Rieden, Juliette: Finally I'm Who I'm Meant to Be, 6 July 2016

External links 

 
 
 
 

1961 births
20th-century Australian actresses
20th-century LGBT people
21st-century Australian actresses
21st-century LGBT people
AACTA Award winners
Australian women comedians
Australian film actresses
Australian musical theatre actresses
Australian television actresses
Australian voice actresses
Australian game show hosts
Comedians from Melbourne
Australian people of English descent
Australian people of Irish descent
Australian people of Polish descent
Australian people of Scottish descent
Actresses from Liverpool
Audiobook narrators
Australian lesbian actresses
Lesbian comedians
Living people
Logie Award winners
Officers of the Order of Australia
University of Melbourne women
20th-century English women
20th-century English people
21st-century English women
21st-century English people
Australian LGBT comedians